Cherokee County is the westernmost county in the U.S. state of North Carolina. It borders Tennessee to its west and Georgia to its south. As of the 2020 census, the population was 28,774. The county seat is Murphy, elevation 1604 ft.

History
This area was occupied for thousands of years by indigenous peoples who settled in the river valleys. It was part of the historic Cherokee homelands, a large territory composed of areas of what are now western Virginia, western North and South Carolina, eastern Tennessee, and northeastern Georgia.

The county was formed in 1839 from the western part of Macon County in the year that the United States removed most of the Cherokee from the Southeast on what became known as the Trail of Tears. The county was named for the Cherokee Native Americans. It is near the Qualla Boundary, now lands of the federally recognized Eastern Band of Cherokee Indians. This is the only such recognized tribe in North Carolina. The tribe is primarily composed of descendants of Cherokee who remained in North Carolina at the time of removal.

As European-American population increased in the area in the 19th century, the state legislature created new counties. In 1861 the southeastern part of Cherokee County became Clay County. In 1872, its northeastern part was separated and organized as Graham County.

In the late 19th century, there was widespread interest in Native American cultures. In the 1870s, the Valentine brothers of Richmond, Virginia, caused extensive damage to at least eight ancient mounds in Cherokee, Haywood, Jackson, and Swain counties. They roughly excavated and looted them, seeking artifacts for the museum of their father, Mann S. Valentine, which he operated in Richmond.

Geography

Located in the southern Appalachian Mountains, Cherokee County contains a varied natural landscape.  Portions of the county fall within the boundaries of the Nantahala National Forest. The Hiwassee River flows into Tennessee after passing through this county from southeast to northwest; it is a tributary of the Tennessee River. Both rivers are known to have had several historic Cherokee towns and villages located along their banks.

In April 1974, parts of Cherokee County were affected by a historic weather event, the 1974 Super Outbreak of tornadoes. This affected parts of 13 states and was the second-largest such event to be recorded in the U.S.

Indian reservation
Portions of the Qualla Boundary, also known as the Eastern Cherokee Indian Reservation, are located in Cherokee County. These are non-contiguous and are separate from the main part of the Qualla Boundary, which is in Swain and Jackson counties. The land is exclusive territory of the federally recognized Eastern Band of Cherokee Indians and is protected by their Tribal Police. Following the success of Harrah's Cherokee Tribal Casino in Cherokee, the EBCI opened a second tribal casino in 2015 on a plot of their land here, located within the Murphy city limits.

National protected area
 Nantahala National Forest (part)

State and local protected areas 
 Cherokee Lake Recreation Area
 Fires Creek Wildlife Management Area (part)
 Hanging Dog Recreation Area

Major water bodies 
 Appalachia Lake
 Harold Wells Lake
 Hiwassee Lake
 Hiwassee River
 Junaluska Creek
 Little Tennessee River
 Moccasin Creek
 Peachtree Creek
 Valley River
 Welch Mill Creek

Adjacent counties
 Graham County - north
 Clay County - east
 Macon County - east
 Fannin County, Georgia - southwest
 Union County, Georgia - south
 Polk County, Tennessee - west
 Monroe County, Tennessee - northwest

Major highways
US 64, the longest highway in North Carolina, and a cross-country highway, passes through the county from east–west. US 74, which links Chattanooga, Asheville, Charlotte, and Wilmington, is a major 4-lane highway through the county. US 19 and US 129 also pass through the county, providing connections to Atlanta to the south and Knoxville to the north. There is also a plan to extend Interstate 24 from Chattanooga, to Charlotte.
 
  (Andrews)
  (Murphy)

Major Infrastrure 
 Western Carolina Regional Airport

Demographics

2020 census

As of the 2020 United States census, there were 28,774 people, 12,471 households, and 8,465 families residing in the county.

2000 census
As of the census of 2000, there were 24,298 people, 10,336 households, and 7,369 families residing in the county.  The population density was 53 people per square mile (21/km2).  There were 13,499 housing units at an average density of 30 per square mile (11/km2).  The racial makeup of the county was 94.82% White, 1.59% Black or African American, 1.63% Native American, 0.28% Asian, 0.01% Pacific Islander, 0.45% from other races, and 1.21% from two or more races.  1.25% of the population were Hispanic or Latino of any race. 34.3% were of American, 10.8% Irish, 10.6% German and 10.3% English ancestry according to Census 2000. 97.7% spoke English and 1.2% Spanish as their first language.

There were 10,336 households, out of which 25.60% had children under the age of 18 living with them, 58.80% were married couples living together, 9.30% had a female householder with no husband present, and 28.70% were non-families. 25.70% of all households were made up of individuals, and 12.50% had someone living alone who was 65 years of age or older.  The average household size was 2.32 and the average family size was 2.76.

In the county, the population was spread out, with 20.60% under the age of 18, 6.50% from 18 to 24, 24.40% from 25 to 44, 28.80% from 45 to 64, and 19.70% who were 65 years of age or older.  The median age was 44 years. For every 100 females there were 94.20 males.  For every 100 females age 18 and over, there were 90.70 males.

The median income for a household in the county was $27,992, and the median income for a family was $33,768. Males had a median income of $26,127 versus $18,908 for females. The per capita income for the county was $15,814.  About 11.70% of families and 15.30% of the population were below the poverty line, including 19.20% of those under age 18 and 18.00% of those age 65 or over.

Government, public safety, and politics

Government
Mandated by the laws of the State of North Carolina, Cherokee County is governed by an elected five-member board of commissioners who each serve a four-year term. The board directs the actions of the appointed Cherokee County Manager. The commission, as of 2020, is composed of Republicans Cal Stiles, Randy Phillips, Gary (Hippie) Westmoreland, Dr. Dan Eichenbaum, and Jan Griggs.

Cherokee County faces more than $50 million in costs related to lawsuits over its Department of Social Services practice of separating children from families with an unlawful form to bypass judicial approval.

Public safety

Sheriff and police
Court protection, jail management, and security for county owned property plus patrol and detective services for unincorporated county areas is provided by the Cherokee County Sheriff. Towns Murphy and Andrews have municipal police departments. The Qualla Boundary tribal police provide security for the Cherokee Nation's Qualla Boundary territories throughout the county.

Fire and EMS
Fire protection is provided by thirteen all-volunteer fire departments in the county including those at Culberson and Murphy. Cherokee County Fire Inspector activity is part of the Cherokee County Building Code Enforcement Office.

Politics

As is becoming increasingly universal for Appalachia, Cherokee is a powerfully Republican county. No Democratic presidential candidate has carried Cherokee County since Jimmy Carter in 1976, and the past five Republican candidates have all exceeded 65 percent of the county's vote, with Donald Trump exceeding 75 percent.

In the North Carolina House of Representatives. Cherokee County lies within the 50th Senate district, represented by Republican Senator Jim Davis, it also lies within the 120th district, and is represented by Republican Kevin Corbin in the North Carolina Senate.

Cherokee County is a member of the regional Southwestern Commission council of governments.

Communities

Towns
 Andrews (largest town)
 Murphy (county seat)

Census-designated place
 Marble

Unincorporated communities
 Culberson
 Hanging Dog
 Owl Creek
 Ranger
 Topton
 Unaka
 Peachtree
 Wehutty
 Liberty
 Violet

Townships
 Beaverdam
 Hothouse
 Murphy
 Notla
 Shoal Creek
 Valleytown

See also
 List of counties in North Carolina
 National Register of Historic Places listings in Cherokee County, North Carolina
 List of national forests of the United States

References

External links

 
 
 Cherokee County North Carolina Profile with photos

 
Counties of Appalachia
1839 establishments in North Carolina
Populated places established in 1839